Colon classification (CC) is a library classification system developed by Shiyali Ramamrita Ranganathan. It was an early faceted (or analytico-synthetic) classification system. The first edition of colon classification was published in 1933, followed by six more editions. It is especially used in libraries in India.

Its name originates from its use of colons to separate facets into classes. Many other classification schemes, some of which are unrelated, also use colons and other punctuation to perform various functions. Originally, CC used only the colon as a separator, but since the second edition, CC has used four other punctuation symbols to identify each facet type.

In CC, facets describe "personality" (the most specific subject), matter, energy, space, and time (PMEST). These facets are generally associated with every item in a library, and thus form a reasonably universal sorting system.

As an example, the subject "research in the cure of tuberculosis of lungs by x-ray conducted in India in 1950" would be categorized as:

This is summarized in a specific call number:

Organization 
The colon classification system uses 42 main classes that are combined with other letters, numbers, and marks in a manner resembling the Library of Congress Classification.

Facets 
CC uses five primary categories, or facets, to specify the sorting of a publication. Collectively, they are called PMEST:

Other symbols can be used to indicate components of facets called isolates, and to specify complex combinations or relationships between disciplines.

Classes 
The following are the main classes of CC, with some subclasses, the main method used to sort the subclass using the PMEST scheme and examples showing application of PMEST.

z Generalia
1 Universe of Knowledge
2 Library Science
3 Book science
4 Journalism
A Natural science
B Mathematics
B2 Algebra
C Physics
D Engineering
E Chemistry
F Technology
G Biology
H Geology
HX Mining
I Botany
J Agriculture
J1 Horticulture
J2 Feed
J3 Food
J4 Stimulant
J5 Oil
J6 Drug
J7 Fabric
J8 Dye
K Zoology 
KZ Animal Husbandry 
L Medicine
LZ3 Pharmacology
LZ5 Pharmacopoeia
M Useful arts
M7 Textiles [material]:[work]
Δ Spiritual experience and mysticism [religion],[entity]:[problem]
N Fine arts
ND Sculpture
NN Engraving
NQ Painting
NR Music
O Literature
P Linguistics
Q Religion
R Philosophy
S Psychology
T Education
U Geography
V History
W Political science
X Economics
Y Sociology
YZ Social Work
Z Law

Example 
A common example of the colon classification is:

 "Research in the cure of the tuberculosis of lungs by x-ray conducted in India in 1950s":
 The main classification is Medicine;
(Medicine)
 Within Medicine, the Lungs are the main concern;

 The property of the Lungs is that they are afflicted with Tuberculosis;

 The Tuberculosis is being performed on, that is the intent is to cure (Treatment);

 The matter that we are treating the Tuberculosis with are X-Rays;

 And this discussion of treatment is regarding the Research phase;

 This Research is performed within a geographical space (.) namely India;

 During the time (') of 1950;

 And finally, translating into the codes listed for each subject and facet the classification becomes

See also
 Bliss bibliographic classification
 Faceted classification
 Subject (documents)
 Universal Decimal Classification

References

Further reading
 Colon Classification (6th Edition) by Shiyali Ramamrita Ranganathan, published by Ess Ess Publications, Delhi, India
 Chan, Lois Mai. Cataloging and Classification: An Introduction. 2nd ed. New York: McGraw-Hill, c. 1994. .

Knowledge representation
Library cataloging and classification